is a former Japanese football player.

Club statistics

References

External links

jsgoal

1982 births
Living people
Shizuoka Sangyo University alumni
Association football people from Osaka Prefecture
Japanese footballers
J2 League players
Japan Football League players
Kataller Toyama players
Association football forwards